2100 Ross Avenue (simply 2100 Ross, formerly San Jacinto Tower) is a 33-story postmodern skyscraper located at 2100 Ross Avenue/2121 San Jacinto Street in the City Center District of downtown Dallas, Texas, in the United States.

In 2012, the building was bought for US$59 million by Cousins Properties, an Atlanta based real estate company. In 2013, the company announced that they would renovate the building's interior. The project includes lobby improvements, high-tech installations, and security upgrades. It was completed in 2014.

The building was then owned by Thomas Dundon who purchased it in 2015 to house his financial firm Dundon Capital Partners. He later sold the building in 2019 following the closure of the Alliance of American Football, a sports league in which he was heavily invested in.

In 2020, law firm Thompson Coburn moved to the building, occupied  of its total floor area.

In Popular Culture
The San Jacinto Tower was used for establishing shots for fictional location of the Oil Barons Club In Season 7 of the original TV series Dallas.

See also
 List of tallest buildings in Dallas

References

External links

2100 Ross Avenue

Office buildings completed in 1982
Skyscraper office buildings in Dallas
1982 establishments in Texas

Modernist architecture in Texas